In Session may refer to:

 In Session (Albert King and Stevie Ray Vaughan album), 1999
 In Session (Lisa Stansfield album), 1996
 In Session (New Order album), 2004
 Glen Campbell and Jimmy Webb: In Session, 2012
 In Session,  a weekdaily news block at Tru TV which provides coverage of trials and legal news